Jaxson Paulo (born 3 October 1999) is a Samoa international rugby league footballer who plays as a er for the  Sydney Roosters  in the NRL.

Background
Paulo was born in Auckland, New Zealand, and is of Samoan descent. He played his junior rugby league for the Nerang Roosters and came through the Gold Coast Titans system.

Early career

2020
Paulo made his debut in round 10 of the 2020 NRL season for South Sydney against the Newcastle Knights. He provided a try assist in the second half as Souths lost the match 20-18 at Western Sydney Stadium.

In round 16 against Parramatta, Paulo scored his first try in the top grade as Souths won the match 38-0 at Bankwest Stadium.

In round 19 against Canterbury-Bankstown, Paulo scored a first half try in South Sydney's upset defeat at ANZ Stadium.  Following Paulo's try, video footage showed the players foot touching the sideline constituting a no try but match officials were not consulted and the on-field decision of try was given.

In the elimination finals game against Parramatta, he scored two tries as Souths came from 18-8 down at half-time to win 38-24 at Bankwest Stadium.

The following week, he played in the club's preliminary final defeat against Penrith at ANZ Stadium.

2021
In round 8 of the 2021 NRL season against Canberra, Paulo fractured his scaphoid in South Sydney's victory.  He was later ruled out for six to eight weeks.

In round 21, he scored two tries for South Sydney in a 40-12 victory over Parramatta.

In round 24, Paulo scored two tries for South Sydney in a 54-12 victory over arch-rivals the Sydney Roosters.

In the 2021 Finals Series, Paulo scored two tries for South Sydney in their 36-16 preliminary final victory over Manly. It was only the second time that Souths had qualified for a grand final since their 1971 triumph.

Paulo played a total of 12 games for South Sydney in the 2021 NRL season including the club's 2021 NRL Grand Final defeat against Penrith.

2022
Following South Sydney's narrow loss to Penrith in round 23 of the 2022 NRL season, Paulo was subjected to online death threats.  Paulo received the death threats in direct messages to his social media account following an error-ridden performance.
On 26 August, Paulo signed a two-year deal to join arch-rivals the Sydney Roosters.

2023
In round 2 of the 2023 NRL season, Paulo scored two tries for the Sydney Roosters in a 20-12 victory over the New Zealand Warriors.
The following week, Paulo scored a further two tries as the Sydney Roosters defeated his former club and arch-rivals South Sydney 20-18.

References

External links
South Sydney Rabbitohs profile

1999 births
Living people
New Zealand sportspeople of Samoan descent
New Zealand rugby league players
Rugby league wingers
Rugby league players from Auckland
Samoa national rugby league team players
South Sydney Rabbitohs players
Sydney Roosters players
People from Takapuna